John-Michael Liles (born November 25, 1980) is an American former professional ice hockey defenseman. He played in the National Hockey League (NHL) for the Colorado Avalanche, Toronto Maple Leafs, Carolina Hurricanes and Boston Bruins. In addition to his playing career, Liles is a minority owner of the Indiana Ice of the United States Hockey League (USHL).

Playing career

Amateur
Born in Indianapolis, Indiana, and raised in Zionsville, Indiana, Liles played most of his minor hockey in nearby Carmel before entering the Culver Military Academy in Culver. As a youth, he played in the 1994 Quebec International Pee-Wee Hockey Tournament with a minor ice hockey team from Indianapolis.

At Culver, Liles lettered in ice hockey and golf. In hockey, he was the varsity "B" team's MVP. He also played on the Varsity "A" team as a sophomore. Liles was then invited and selected to play in the U.S. National Team Development Program based in Ann Arbor, Michigan, in which he was an integral part of the blueline in both the under-17s and −18 squads. In the 1999–2000 season, he was recruited to play collegiate hockey with Michigan State University of the Central Collegiate Hockey Association (CCHA) and as a Freshman led the defensemen in scoring with an impressive 28 points in 40 games.

Emerging as an offensive talent, though hindered by size, Liles was drafted in the fifth round, 159th overall, in the 2000 NHL Entry Draft by the Colorado Avalanche. Alongside teammate Brad Fast, Liles formed a star offensive duo among Spartan defensemen and in his sophomore year, he scored 25 points in 42 contests to be named to the All-CCHA Second Team. In the 2001–02 season, Liles led the entire Spartans team in scoring with 35 points, earning him a selection to the All-CCHA First Team and Second All-American Team. On October 6, 2001, Liles also took part in the famous Cold War outdoor game, which at that time held the attendance record for an ice hockey game, against the University of Michigan.

During his senior season with the Spartans, Liles again led the team in scoring, registering 50 points in just 39 games while helping Michigan State to a 23–14–2 record. Earning the CCHA Best Offensive Defensemen Award for the second consecutive year, he scored an average of 1.28 points per game for Michigan State and was also a finalist for the Hobey Baker Award.

Professional

Colorado Avalanche
After completing his collegiate career, Liles signed a two-year, entry-level contract with the Avalanche on March 29, 2003. Signing an amateur try-out contract the following day with Colorado's American Hockey League (AHL) affiliate, the Hershey Bears, Liles made his professional debut against the Grand Rapids Griffins on March 30 and played in ten games to end the 2002–03 season.

In the 2003–04 season, Liles made the Avalanche roster out of college and scored his first NHL goal and point, a game-winner, against the Minnesota Wild on October 16, 2003. He led all rookie defensemen with ten goals and 34 points in 79 games to be named to the NHL All-Rookie Team while also becoming highest point-scoring rookie defenseman in Avalanche history, and second in franchise history since Bruce Bell's 37 with the Quebec Nordiques in 1984–85.

During the NHL lockout the next season, Liles enjoyed a brief stint in the German Deutsche Eishockey Liga (DEL) for the Iserlohn Roosters, playing in 17 contests and scoring 11 points. He then returned to the Avalanche for the 2005–06 season and established himself within the Avalanche defensive corps, appearing in all 82 regular season games and finishing tied in first in goals scored by a defenseman with Rob Blake, with 14. Improving his offensive numbers in every category, Liles also set a new team record among defensemen with 14 points scored in the month of October. Following another impressive season, he then signed a two-year contract extension on July 12, 2006.

With the arrival of rookie Paul Stastny surprisingly making the team in 2006–07, Liles relinquished his number 26 jersey, worn by former Quebec Nordiques great Peter Šťastný, for Paul Stastny to wear in honor of his father. With the change to the number 4 jersey, Liles led the Avalanche defense in scoring with 14 goals and 44 points, placing tenth in the NHL. In reaching his tenth goal against the Dallas Stars on December 27, 2006, Liles became the first defensemen in the NHL since Steve Duchesne in 1987–88 to score at least ten goals in his first three NHL seasons.

After suffering the disappointment of failing to qualify for the Stanley Cup playoffs for the first time in Avalanche History, Liles helped lead the team return to the post-season in 2007–08. On December 17, 2007, he recorded two helpers against the Los Angeles Kings to surpass 100 career assists in the NHL. Despite leading the defense in scoring for a second consecutive year, he recorded a career-low six goals for 32 points in 81 games. On the eve of the beginning of the free agency period, on July 1, Liles was re-signed to a new four-year contract with the Avalanche on June 30, 2008.

In the 2008–09 season, Liles rebounded offensively to again top all Avalanche defensemen in goals with 12, and ranked fourth on the team in points with 39 as the struggling Avalanche finished 27th in the NHL, its worst-ever finish under the Avalanche name. Transitioning into a senior role for the Colorado defense, Liles scored his 50th career goal against the Toronto Maple Leafs on January 29, 2009, to become only the fifth defender in Quebec/Colorado history to achieve the feat.

Hampered by a re-occurring shoulder injury midway through the 2009–10 season, Liles also struggled with returning to form and was a healthy scratch for a brief period of time for the first time in his NHL career. Despite playing in a career-low 59 regular season games for 31 points, he still led the resurgent youth-laden Avalanche team in defenseman scoring for a fourth consecutive season.

To begin the 2010–11 season, Liles made NHL and franchise history when he recorded an assist in a 4–3 overtime loss to the Vancouver Canucks on October 26, 2010, giving him assists in nine consecutive games to open the season. Despite the Avalanche failing to qualify for the 2011 playoffs, Liles accumulated a career-high 40 assists in 76 games played.

Toronto Maple Leafs
On June 24, 2011, Liles was traded by the Avalanche to the Toronto Maple Leafs in exchange for a second-round pick in the 2012 NHL Entry Draft. He scored his first goal as a Maple Leaf in a game against the Columbus Blue Jackets. On January 25, 2012, Liles signed a four-year, $15.5 million contract extension with the Maple Leafs.
On October 1, 2013, after being waived by the Maple Leafs, he was assigned to the team's AHL affiliate, the Toronto Marlies. He was later recalled to the NHL on October 28, sent back on November 15, then recalled again on December 6.

Carolina Hurricanes
On January 1, 2014, Liles was traded to the Carolina Hurricanes, along with Toronto prospect Dennis Robertson, in exchange for defenseman Tim Gleason, just minutes before the former was scheduled to play for the Maple Leafs in the 2014 NHL Winter Classic against the Detroit Red Wings.

Boston Bruins
On February 29, 2016, Liles was traded to the Boston Bruins in exchange for Anthony Camara, a 2016 third-round pick and a 2017 fifth-round pick.

On July 1, 2016, he re-signed a one-year deal, worth $2 million with the Bruins. In his second season with the Bruins in 2016-17, restricted by injury and also reassigned to a depth role, Liles appeared in just 36 games with the Bruins totalling 5 assists.

Retirement
Due to a concussion in his final year with Boston, Liles opted to end his 14-year professional career, returning to Colorado with his family and accepting a part-time role as a studio analyst for Altitude Sports in covering the Colorado Avalanche.

International play
Initially, Liles was selected to play for Team USA in the 2000 World Junior Championships in Umeå, Sweden, but suffered an injured shoulder in the last minute of the last exhibition game to rule him out of the tournament. During the 2004–05 NHL lockout, Liles made his international debut when he was recalled prior to his European stint with the DEL's Islerhohn Roosters as an injury replacement for Hal Gill for the 2004 World Cup. After scoring in his first exhibition game against Russia, Liles played in two games during the World Cup.

Liles' place was retained within Team USA when he was named, alongside future teammate Jordan Leopold, as a part of the young core of the squad to appear at the 2005 World Championships. Liles, however, went pointless in seven games before the U.S. finished in sixth place after elimination in the quarter-finals to the tournament's eventual gold medalists, the Czech Republic.

During the 2005–06 season, Liles was named to Team USA for the 2006 Winter Olympics in Turin, Italy. He appeared in all six games for the underwhelming U.S. team, recording two assists before suffering elimination in a quarter-final loss to Finland, 4–3.

Three years later, Liles returned to Team USA when he was added to the team's roster for the 2009 World Championships following Colorado's cellar-dwelling season in 2008–09. He finished the tournament with the most points on the team, as well as second-most overall amongst tournament defenseman, scoring nine points from nine games. Team USA ended up fourth overall, losing the bronze medal game to Sweden.

Personal life
Liles married fiancée Erin Johnson in 2013. Together they have one daughter named Ava.

Records
 Longest consecutive point-scoring streak for an NHL defenseman from start of season, 9.

Career statistics

Regular season and playoffs

International

Awards and honors

References

External links
 

1980 births
Living people
American expatriate ice hockey players in Germany
American men's ice hockey defensemen
Boston Bruins players
Carolina Hurricanes players
Colorado Avalanche draft picks
Colorado Avalanche players
Hershey Bears players
Ice hockey players at the 2006 Winter Olympics
Ice hockey players from Indiana
Iserlohn Roosters players
People from Zionsville, Indiana
Michigan State Spartans men's ice hockey players
Olympic ice hockey players of the United States
Sportspeople from Indianapolis
Toronto Maple Leafs players
Toronto Marlies players
USA Hockey National Team Development Program players
Culver Academies alumni
AHCA Division I men's ice hockey All-Americans
American expatriate ice hockey players in Canada